Aniana is a monotypic moth genus of the family Noctuidae. Its only species, Aniana straminealis, is found in Brazil. Both the genus and the species were first described by Francis Walker in 1866.

References

Catocalinae
Noctuoidea genera
Monotypic moth genera